Peter John Helm Jr. (born December 22, 1941) is a Canadian-American film and television actor.

Helm was born in Toronto, Ontario. Helm began his acting career in 1959, appearing in the television sitcom Too Young to Go Steady. In 1960 he appeared in the Broadway play There Was a Little Girl. He guest-starred in television programs including Rawhide, The Farmer's Daughter, Ironside, Wagon Train, Mr. Novak, Tales of Wells Fargo, Naked City, The Donna Reed Show, Bonanza, Dr. Kildare, My Three Sons, Perry Mason, Kraft Suspense Theatre, and The Fugitive. Helm's film appearances included The Longest Day and Inside Daisy Clover.

References

External links 

Rotten Tomatoes profile

1941 births
Living people
Male actors from Toronto
Canadian emigrants to the United States
American male film actors
American male television actors
Canadian male film actors
Canadian male television actors
20th-century American male actors
20th-century Canadian male actors
Western (genre) television actors